Phenacogrammus is a genus of African tetras found in Middle Africa.

Species
There are currently 10 recognized species in this genus:
 Phenacogrammus ansorgii (Boulenger, 1910)
 Phenacogrammus aurantiacus (Pellegrin, 1930)
 Phenacogrammus bleheri Géry, 1995
 Phenacogrammus deheyni Poll, 1945
 Phenacogrammus interruptus (Boulenger, 1899) (Congo tetra)
 Phenacogrammus major (Boulenger, 1903)
 Phenacogrammus polli J. G. Lambert, 1961
 Phenacogrammus stigmatura (Fowler, 1936)
 Phenacogrammus taeniatus Géry, 1996
 Phenacogrammus urotaenia (Boulenger, 1909)

References

Alestidae
Fish of Africa
Taxa named by Carl H. Eigenmann